Lucas Lykkegaard (born 5 April 2002) is a Danish professional footballer who plays as a right-back for Danish Superliga club FC Nordsjælland.

Club career
Lykkegaard was born and raised in Farum and is a product of FC Nordsjælland, where he started when he was four years old. In his first season as U17 player, Lykkegaard was injured with an anterior cruciate ligament injury and was out for about a year and a half.

After 14 years at the club, Lykkegaard was promoted to the first-team squad, where he made his professional debut in the Danish Superliga against FC Copenhagen on 13 December 2020. Lykkegaard started on the bench, before replacing Daniel Svensson in the 78th minute. Lykkegaard also played in the following league game against FC Midtjylland. Those two games were his only appearances in the 2020–21 season. On 21 July 2022, Lykkegaard signed a new deal with Nordsjælland until June 2025 and was loaned out to newly promoted Danish 1st Division club Hillerød.

Personal life
Lykkegaard has a Chilean mother and a Danish father.

References

External links
 
 Lucas Lykkegaard at DBU

2002 births
Living people
Danish men's footballers
Danish people of Chilean descent
Sportspeople of Chilean descent
Association football defenders
Denmark youth international footballers
Danish Superliga players
FC Nordsjælland players
Hillerød Fodbold players
Sportspeople from the Capital Region of Denmark